Star Wars Republic Commando: Triple Zero, by Karen Traviss, is the second novel in the Star Wars Republic Commando series. The title comes from the galactic coordinates of the planet Coruscant (0,0,0).

Plot
Following the eruption of the bloody Clone Wars at the battle of Geonosis, both sides remain deadlocked in a stalemate that can be broken only by elite warrior teams like Omega Squad, clone commandos with terrifying combat skills and a lethal arsenal.

Deployed deep behind enemy lines, Omega Squad engage in sabotage, espionage, ambush, and assassination. But when the Squad is rushed to Coruscant, the war's most dangerous new hotspot, the commandos discover that they are not the only ones penetrating the heart of the enemy.

A surge in Separatist attacks has been traced to a network of terrorist cells in the Republic's capital, masterminded by a mole in Command Headquarters. To identify and destroy a Separatist spy and terror network in a city full of civilians will require special talents and skills. Not even the leadership of the Jedi generals, along with the assistance of Delta Squad and a notorious ARC trooper, can even the odds against the Republic Commandos. And while success may not bring victory in the Clone Wars, failure means certain defeat.

Characters 
Mandalorian:
 Sergeant Kal Skirata, Mercenary (Male Human)
 Sergeant Walon Vau, Mercenary (Male Human)

Republic Commandos:

Omega Squad:
 RC-1309 Niner
 RC-1136 Darman
 RC-8015 Fi
 RC-3222 Atin

Delta Squad:
 RC-1138 Boss
 RC-1262 Scorch
 RC-1140 Fixer
 RC-1207 Sev

ARC Troopers
 Null ARC N-11 Captain Ordo
 Null ARC N-7 Lieutenant Mereel
 ARC A-26 Captain Maze

Jedi:
 Etain Tur-Mukan, Jedi Knight (Female Human)
 Bardan Jusik, Jedi Knight (Male Human)
 Iri Camas, Jedi Master (Male Human)
 Vaas Ga, Jedi Master (Male Duros)

Others:
 Clone Commander Gett, Leader of Improcco Company, 41st Elite Corps
 Clone Commander Gree, Commander of 41st Elite Corps
 Clone Trooper CT-5108/8843 Corr, GAR Logistics Employee
 Clone Trooper CT-1127/549 Sicko, Special Operations Pilot
 Clone Trooper Nye, Improcco Company, 41st Elite Corps
 Clone Trooper Clanky, Improcco Company, 41st Elite Corps
 Clone Trooper Fi, Improcco Company, 41st Elite Corps
 Captain Jaller Obrim, Coruscant Security Force (Male Human)
 Jinart, Qiiluran Spy (Female Gurlanin)
 Enacca, Associate of Kal Skirata (Female Wookiee)
 Qibbu, Entrepreneur (Male Hutt)
 Laseema, Employee of Qibbu (Female Twi'lek)
 Besany Wennen, GAR Logistics Employee (Female Human)

See also

 Star Wars Republic Commando series
 Star Wars: Republic Commando
 Star Wars Republic Commando: Hard Contact
 Star Wars Republic Commando: True Colors
 Star Wars Republic Commando: Order 66

References

External links
 Amazon.com Listing
 Official CargoBay Listing

Republic Commando
2006 British novels
2006 science fiction novels
English novels
Novels based on Star Wars video games
Del Rey books